Mohammad Shahjahan is a two star admiral of Bangladesh and the incumbent chairman of Chittagong Port Authority. Earlier he was the chairman of the Mongla Port Authority. In previous he has also served as deputy director general of Bangladesh Coast Guard.

Career 
Shahjahan joined the Bangladesh Navy on July 24, 1984, and received his commission on January 1 in 1987. He is the ex-officio chairman of the executive committee of Chattogram Bandar Mohila College.

On 11 March 2019, Shajahan was appointed the deputy director general of Bangladesh Coast Guard.

On 9 April 2020, Shahjahan was promoted to rear admiral from commodore after he was appointed chairman of Mongla Port Authority on 8 April. In January 2021, Shahjahan was appointed chairman of Chattogram Port Authority from chairman of Mongla Port Authority. He replaced admiral SM Abul Kalam Azad at the Chattogram Port Authority. Rear Admiral Mohammad Musa replaced him as the chairman of Mongla Port Authority. Shahjahan announced plans to build a Bay Container Terminal at Chittagong Port. He hosted Red Sea Gateway Terminal, a Saudi company, and the ambassador of Bangladesh to Saudi Arabia, Mohammad Javed Patwari, to attract Saudi investment in the Patenga Container Terminal. He expressed anger at BM Container Depot Limited for their handling of the 2022 Sitakunda fire at their terminal. He oversaw the first direct container to arrive from Europe.

Lighter vessel workers went on strike at Chittagong Port demanding the resignation of Shahjahan on 11 November 2022.

References 

Bangladesh Navy personnel
Bangladeshi Navy admirals
Living people
Year of birth missing (living people)